Steele of the Royal Mounted is a 1925 American silent Western film directed by David Smith and starring Bert Lytell, Stuart Holmes and Charlotte Merriam. It is based on a novel by James Oliver Curwood about the Royal Canadian Mounted Police, and was shot on location in the San Bernardino National Forest.

Plot
As described in a film magazine review, Isobel, an Eastern young woman, introduces Philip Steele to her father Colonel Becker, but as a trick implies that her father is her husband. Philip becomes disillusioned and goes to Canada and joins the North-West Mounted Police. Here he pursues a bad man. In the meantime, the young woman seeks him out so she can explain the mistake she made. When she finds him, he has bagged his man, and there is a reconciliation.

Cast

References

Bibliography
 Munden, Kenneth White. The American Film Institute Catalog of Motion Pictures Produced in the United States, Part 1. University of California Press, 1997.

External links

1925 films
1925 Western (genre) films
Films directed by David Smith (director)
American black-and-white films
Vitagraph Studios films
Northern (genre) films
Royal Canadian Mounted Police in fiction
Films based on novels by James Oliver Curwood
Silent American Western (genre) films
1920s English-language films
1920s American films